The Martin Werhand Verlag is a German publishing house with a focus on contemporary literature and poetry. More than 25% of the 150 published authors have an immigrant background with parents who were born outside of Germany and have their roots in countries like the Netherlands, Greece, Spain, Croatia, Austria, Italy, Poland, Hungary, Latvia, Iran, Kazakhstan, Romania, Bulgaria, Turkey, Sri Lanka, South Korea, Russia or Uganda. Thus is also a mirror image of the German Society. The Martin Werhand publishing house stands for tolerance, integration and openness. It is located in Rhineland-Palatinate.

Foundation 
The Martin Werhand publishing house was founded in April 1997 by the German philologist, author and editor Martin Werhand. Martin is the son of Klaus Rudolf Werhand, a Neuwied-born blacksmith and art metal sculptor.

The beginning history of the publishing house started with the University of Bonn and University of Cologne, from where the first anthology of poetry Junge Lyrik took its beginning in 1999. From 1999 to 2002 the Martin Werhand publishing house has published three successful poetry volumes named Junge Lyrik, Junge Lyrik II and Junge Lyrik III, in each of which 750 poems were included from 50 young, previously unpublished authors. This was associated with a reading series where the authors recited their works in different towns in Germany like Essen, Bonn or Cologne. In 2003, the Thalia bookstore organized via its parent company Poertgen Herder in Münster on World Book Day on 23 April a reading with the anthology series Junge Lyrik. In 2006 the Bremer Straßenbahn AG under the direction of Dr. Joachim Tuz started a visual lyrical project called Poetry in Motion (Poesie bewegt) with many of the Martin Werhand publishing house authors with their contemporary poems.

In 2014 the Martin Werhand Verlag started a poetry series called 100 Gedichte. In 2016 the publishing house presented some new book series at Frankfurt Book Fair. like  or 50 Gedichte.

Renowned literary publishing houses such as Reclam Verlag or Thienemann Verlag engage in choosing their anthologies back on the authorship of the Martin Werhand publishing house in the recent past.

Authors 
Among the published authors are the Bulgarian-born author Angela Litschev (Förderpreis für Literatur der Landeshauptstadt Düsseldorf) 2005, the poet Patric Hemgesberg, musician and writer Christian Jahl, the Austrian-born theatre director and playwright Georgia Doll, the poet Meinolf Finke, the writer Renate Freund, the Spanish-born actor Mario Ramos who won the Hersfeld-Preis in 2005, the poet Vera Ludwig, the poet Thomas Bruns, the Haiku-writer Daniel Dölschner, poet and translator Ann Catrin Apstein-Müller, Daniela Frickel of the University of Cologne, the Slam Poetry artist Florian Cieslik, the writer Andrea Heuser (Wolfgang-Weyrauch-Förderpreis) 2007, the playwright Peter Wayand, Werner Moskopp of the University of Koblenz and Landau, the poet Thorsten Libotte, the writer Thomas Wensing, the poet Frank Findeiß and the journalist Simone Roßkamp who won the Axel-Springer-Preis in 2005.

Publications (selection)

References

External links 
  
 Appearance at Frankfurt Book Fair October 2016 
 Martin Werhand Verlag in: WorldCat

Publishing companies established in 1997
Book publishing companies of Germany
1997 establishments in Germany
Culture of Rhineland-Palatinate